Geoff Atkinson is a British comedy writer and producer.

He has written and produced shows featuring Rory Bremner. He is managing director of Vera Productions, an Independent production company he established with Bremner.

Beginning his career in Punch magazine, he worked with many prominent figures in British comedy, such as Douglas Adams and John Lloyd. He was one of the main writers on Spitting Image. He has also written for Alistair McGowan, and Lenny Henry, and Cannon and Ball.

In 1990 he wrote the short-lived and highly controversial sitcom Heil Honey I'm Home! for British Satellite Broadcasting scrapped after only one episode was transmitted. It was intended as a parody of 1950s American sitcoms, but featuring Adolf Hitler and Eva Braun as the lead characters.

In 2007, he was executive producer on the documentary Dispatches: Mark Thomas on Coca Cola with Mark Thomas.

References 
 
 Comedy Kings - Cannon and Ball
 BBC Comedy Guide on Alistair McGowan's Big Impression
 BBC Comedy Guide on The Lenny Henry Show

External links 
 Geoff Atkinson interviewed by The Stage

British television producers
Living people
Year of birth missing (living people)